France competed at the 1984 Summer Paralympics in Stoke Mandeville, Great Britain and New York City, United States. 115 competitors from France won 186 medals including 71 gold, 69 silver and 46 bronze and finished 6th in the medal table.

Medalists

Gold medalists

Silver medalists

Bronze medalists

See also
 France at the Paralympics
 France at the 1984 Summer Olympics

References

France at the Paralympics
1984 in French sport
Nations at the 1984 Summer Paralympics